George Clifton may refer to:

 George Clifton (plant collector) (1823–1913), English collector of seaweed specimens, active in Australia
 George Clifton (footballer) (1865–1947), English footballer
 George Herbert Clifton (1898–1970), officer in the New Zealand Military Forces